Insult to Injury is the sixth studio album by British band The Nightingales. The album was recorded in March 2008 at the Faust Studio, Scheer, Germany.

Track listing 
 "I Am Grimaldi"
 "Old Fruit"
 "Double Whammy Bar"
 "Brownhills United's Tattooed Southpaw"
 "Little Lambs"
 "Kirklees Ken"
 "Big Bones"
 "Crap Lech"
 "Former Florist to The Queen"
 "The Kiss of Life"
 "Down With The Blue Lobsters"
 "Watch Your Posture"

Personnel 
 Robert Lloyd – Vocals and mouth organ
 Alan Apperley – Guitars, bass, keyboard, vocals
 Daren Garratt – Drums, percussion, and melodeon
 Matt Wood –  Guitars, bass, and stylophone

Reception 
Metacritic, a review aggregator that assigns a normalized score, rated it 59/100 based on four reviews.  Ben Thompson of The Observer rated it 4/5 stars and called it Lloyd's "freshest and most subtly intoxicating work to date."

References

External links 
 Official artist website

2008 albums
The Nightingales albums
Alternative rock albums by British artists